Pekalongan Regency is a regency on the north coast of Central Java province in Indonesia. It covers an area of 836.13 km2 and had a population of 838,621 at the 2010 census and 968,821 at the 2020 census, comprising 491,607 males and 477,214 females. Its administrative centre was formerly at Pekalongan City, but since that city was administratively separated from the regency, the regency's capital is now at Kajen, which is located in the middle of the regency, about 25 km south of Pekalongan City. Pekalongan residents are well known for their pursuit of perfection regarding the Indonesian traditional clothing called Batik.

The Dutch name of the regency is 'Pacalongan'.

History
The word Pekalongan is believed to be derived from the Javanese word, Topo Ngalong, which means "bat-like meditation".

Geography
The northern part of the Pekalongan Regency is lowland, while the southern part of the regency is highland.

Administrative Districts
Pekalongan Regency comprises nineteen districts (kecamatan), tabulated below with their areas and their populations at the 2010 census and the 2020 census. The table also includes the number of administrative villages (rural desa and urban kelurahan) in each district and its post code.

Tourism
Pekalongan has long been known as a "batik city", and one of the centers of batik production is in the Districts of Buaran and Wiradesa. Some of the names of batik producers that are quite well known include  Batik Humas  (short for Husein Mohammad Assegaff). While the famous sarong (palekat fabric) factory in Pekalongan includes "Gajah Duduk" and "WadiMoor".
There is also a batik center in Wiradesa which is International Batik Center (IBC).

Actually there are still a lot of tourism potential that can be developed in Pekalongan Regency, among others, Sunter Beach Depok, Watu Bahan, Wonokerto Beach, Petungkriyono Ecotourism, Water Tourism, Forest Tourism, Cultural Tourism, Curug Siwatang Paninggaran, Temple Trenggolek Paninggaran, Anjir Peak, Bukit Pawuluhan Kandangserang, and others. There are also hidden beautiful natural attractions such as Curug Bajing which access roads are not yet available. Pekalongan is still waiting for investors who want develop this attraction.

For food connoisseurs, Pekalongan provides culinary tourism in the form of Taoto and megono rice, Taoto is a kind of soto that is made with taco sauce and with meat and buffalo spices. Medium megono is chopped young jackfruit flavored with grated coconut and steamed which is suitable to be enjoyed while still hot

For those of you who like historical tours, you can visit the Pabrik Gula Sragie sugar factory located in the Sragi District. The factory is a Dutch colonial factory.

In the southern part of regency there is a mountainous tourist area named Linggo Asri, which includes bathing area, relics of lingga and yoni, playground and pine forest. There are also Pekalongan Hindu communities here.

Transportation 
For travelers who are going on an adventure in Pekalongan Regency, there are many modes of transportation, including bus or angkot.
In Kajen there is a bus terminal which is quite large namely Kajen Main Terminal which serves the Jakarta - Pekalongan route. Buses serving these routes include Dewi Sri, Dedy Jaya, Sinar Jaya, Kurnia Jaya, Garuda Mas, Laju Prima, etc.

There is also the only station in Pekalongan Regency, namely Sragi Station. Unfortunately, this station does not serve passengers because its status is a small station.
However, for those of you who choose the train transportation mode, you don't need to worry because there are still other alternative stations, namely Pekalongan Station located in Pekalongan City. This station is a class A station that serves the entire train journey (except Argo Anggrek Malam) both from Jakarta and Surabaya.

Traditional foods
Pekalongan offers several traditional foods, such as:

Sego Megono (Megono Rice)
Sego Megono is rice with sliced young jackfruit and grated coconut. It is savory and spicy, it's usually served while still hot with an additional menu of fresh vegetables and fried fish. Sego megono is usually wrapped in teak leaves or banana leaves. Some people also call it "Sego Gori" (Jackfruit Rice).

Soto Tauto Pekalongan (Pekalongan Tauto Soup)

Soto tauto is a kind of meat soup with thick sauce made with tauto (fermented soy), buffalo meat and bowel.

Pindang Tetel
A kind of soup, where the seasoning sauce are processed with ripe pucung fruit.

Iwak Panggang (Smoked Fish)
This food is made of fish that is processed by smoking the fish, the fish will change its color, flavor and aroma. This food can be found in Pekalongan traditional markets.

Wajik Kletik
Wajik Kletik is some kind of cake with diamond shape made from glutinous rice plus brown sugar and grated coconut mixed together.

Kopi Tahlil
Kopi tahlil is made from a blend of pure coffee with spices like ginger, cardamom, cloves, cinnamon, pandanus leaves, lemongrass, and nutmeg.

Apem Kesesi
Apem kesesi is made from rice flour and palm/red sugar, the food was famous in pekalongan surrounding areas particularly in the western part up to the Comal, because it also markets to Comal traditional markets. Many people also recognize this food as Apem Comal.

Usek Krenyes
Is a typical food Paninggaran a type of cracker made from tapioca flour and fried using river sand which of course has also been cleaned. "Krenyes" in Indonesian is a spice up on the usek. There are two variants of taste, namely spicy and sweety.

Ondhol
Namely a kind of food typical of Paninggaran which is made from grated cassava.

Education
There are several colleges and academies in Pekalongan Regency.
 The State Institute for Islamic Study (IAIN) Pekalongan
 Muhammadiyah Polytechnic Pekalongan, Kajen
 College of Health Sciences (STIKES) Muhammadiyah Pekajangan
 Academy of Health Analysis (AAK) Pekalongan
 STIKAP (Islamic High School Kyai Ageng Pekalongan) YMI Wonopringgo Pekalongan
 Indonesia Open University (UPBJJ)

Higher Education 
 NU Pekalongan University
 Pekalongan State Islamic Institute (IAIN)
 Pekalongan University (UNIKAL) Pekalongan
 Kajen Community Community Academy (AKN)
 Muhammadiyah University Pekajangan Pekalongan (UMPP)
 Pekalongan Academy of Health Analysis (AAK)
 STIKAP (Kyai Ageng Islamic High School Pekalongan) YMI Wonopringgo Pekalongan
 UT Pekalongan Regency

Vocational High School 
 State Vocational School Sragi, Kedungwuni, Lebakbarang, Karangdadap
 SMK Yapenda 01 Kedungwuni
 SMK Yapenda 02 Wiradesa Pekalongan
 Muhammadiyah Bligo Vocational School
 Muhammadiyah Bojong Vocational School
 SMK Muhamaduyah Kesesi
 SMK Muhamadiyah Kajen
 Kedungwuni Muhamadiyah Vocational School
 Muhammadiyah Karanganyar Vocational School
 Muhamadiyah Wiradesa Vocational School
 Muhammadiyah Talun Vocational School
 Muhamadiyah Doro Vocational School
 SMK Muhamadiyah Pencongan
 SMK Islamiyyah Sapugarut
 Bojong Islamic Vocational School
 Salakbrojo Kedungwuni Islamic Vocational School
 45 Islamic High School Wiradesa
 Al-Fusha Kedungwuni Vocational School
 SMK Ar Rahman Watusalam
 Vocational School Ma'arif NU Tirto
 Vocational School Ma'arif NU Kajen
 SMK Ma'arif NU Kesesi
 Vocational School Ma'arif NU Doro
 Wira Bahari Wiradesa Vocational School
 Gondang Vocational School
 SMK Nurul Ummah Paninggaran
 SMK Diponegoro Karanganyar
 Vocational High School Siwalan Community Development
 Prima Kesesi Vocational School
 SMK NU Sragi
 SMK NU Kesesi

High school 
 Public High School ( Bojong, Doro, Kajen, Kedungwuni, Kesesi, Kandangserang, Kesesi, Sragi, Paninggaran, Petungkriono, Talun, Wiradesa)
 Muhammadiyah I Pekajangan High School
 Muhammadiyah II Pekajangan High School
 SMA PGRI 1 Wiradesa
 SMA PGRI 2 Kajen
 Yapenda Karanganyar High School
 Doro Islamic High School
 YMI Wonopringgo Islamic High School
 Hasbullah Karanganyar Islamic High School
 MAN Pekalongan
 MA Ath-Thohiriyyah
 MA NU Karangdadap
 MA Salafiyah Simbangkulon Buaran
 MA Dr. Ibnu Mas'ud Wiradesa
 MA Muhammadiyah Pekajangan
 MA Hasbullah Karanganyar
 MA Nahdliyah Talun
 MA Salafiyah Syafiiyah Proto
 MA Yappi Kesesi
 MA Walisongo Kedungwuni
 MA Walisongo Pekajangan
 MA YMI Wonopringgo

Junior high school 
 Middle School Bojong, Buaran, Doro, Kajen, Kesesi, Karangdadap, Kedungwuni, Kandangserang, Lebakbarang, Wiradesa, Tirto, Paninggaran, Petungkriyono, Sragi, Siwalan, Talun, Wonopringgo, Wonokerto, (2 State Junior High Schools in Each Sub-District)
 Pajomblangan NU Middle School
 Karangdadap NU Middle School
 Muhammadiyah Wiradesa Middle School, Bligo, Pekajangan, Wonopringgo, Kesesi
 Junior "NU" Kesesi, Kajen, Pajomblangan, Karangdadap
 YMI Wonopringgo Islamic Middle School
 Islamic Rembun Middle School, Simbang Wetan, Wonopringgo
 Walisongo Islamic Kedungwuni Middle School
 MTS Ath-Thohiriyyah
 MTS Muhammadiyah Pekajangan
 MTS Kajen Pekajangan
 MTS Gondang Wonopringgo, Pekalongan
 MTS "Kalijambe" Sragi
 MTsS Balanced kulon 1
 MTS Salafiyah Simbang Kulon 2, Buaran, Pekalongan
 MTs S Wonoyoso
 MTS YMI Wonopringgo Pekalongan
 MTS Al-Hikmah Tangkil Kulon, Kedungwuni, Pekalongan
 MTS Yapik Kutosari, Karanganyar, Pekalongan
 MTS Salafiyah Kadipaten, Wiradesa, Pekalongan
 MTS Al-Hikmah Proto, Kedungwuni, Pekalongan
 MTS Salafiyyah Paninggaran, Pekalongan.
 MTs Negeri 2 Pekalongan

Health facilities
There are several health facilities in Pekalongan Regency.
 Pekajangan Islamic Hospital (RSI) in Ambokembang, Kedungwuni District
 Kajen General Hospital (RSU) in Karanganyar District
 Kraton General Hospital (RSU) in Pekalongan

Natives
 Adi Kurdi, Indonesian actor
 Dharsono Hartono Rekso, 1st ASEAN Secretary General
 Abdul Hakim Garuda Nusantara, lawyer, human rights defender
 Zainal Abidin Domba, Indonesian actor
 Rudy Hadisuwarno, professional hairdresser
 Beb Bakhuys, Dutch footballer
 Joe Hin Tjio, scientist
 Asip Kholbihi, Regent of Pekalongan Regency (2015-2020)

Dialects
Pekalongan people have their own dialect. The dialects usually ending an order sentence with the word "ra". For example: "ojo koyo kui ra" (don't be like that). On the southern regency the dialect differs a little, where most possibility sentence is followed by the word "ndean", other typical southern pekalongan dialect is the use of word Cok-e which means "maybe". Some example are: "wis mangan, ndean!? wis mangan, cok-e!?" ("have he eat? maybe he has?"). There are other typical dialect like the use of the word "pak ora si" which means "It doesn't matter".

People 
 Abdul Rahman Saleh, advocate, actor, former Supreme Court judge, former Attorney General, former Indonesian Ambassador to the Kingdom of Denmark
 Adi Kurdi, actor (film player, Cemara Family)
 Hartono Rekso Dharsono, ASEAN Secretary General 1
 Abdul Hakim Garuda Nusantara, lawyer, human rights activist
 Zainal Abidin Domba, actor
 Rudy Hadisuwarno, a professional hairdresser
 Fadia A. Rafiq, singer and deputy regent of Pekalongan Regency
 Beb Bakhuys, former football player soccer and coach from Netherlands
 Joe Hin Tjio, the discoverer of human chromosomes number 23
 R.T.A Milono, first Central Kalimantan governor and former East Java governor

See also
Kedungwuni

References

External links

 

Regencies of Central Java